According to The Deaf Unit Cairo, there are approximately 1.2 million deaf and hard of hearing individuals in Egypt aged five and older.  Deafness can be detected in certain cases at birth or throughout childhood in terms of communication delays and detecting language deprivation. The primary language used amongst the deaf population in Egypt is Egyptian Sign Language (ESL) and is widely used throughout the community in many environments such as schools, deaf organizations, etc. Ths article focuses on the many different aspects of Egyptian life and the impacts it has on the deaf community.

Language emergence 
The primary sign language used throughout Egypt is Egyptian Sign Language (ESL) which emerged around 1984 when the National Association of the Deaf created an online dictionary. According to Ryan Fan in Verb Agreement, Negation, and Aspectual Marking in Egyptian Sign Language the only data documented in regards to Egyptian Sign Language are within the DVD dictionary published by the Deaf Unit and in a textbook published by Asdaa' Association for the Hearing Impaired in Alexandria.  There is currently little information present about variation in ESL as well as "no grammatical descriptions available".

Significant organizations

The National Association for the Deaf 
The NAD is housed in Old Cairo, and has educational programs for Deaf adults.

Asdaa' 
The Asdaa' association runs various educational programs for sign language and the Deaf community in Alexandria.

The Deaf Fraternal Society 
The Deaf Fraternal Society is an entirely Deaf-run organization in Alexandria.

The Egyptian Institute for Deaf Rights 
The EIDR is an institution in Giza that works for the legal rights of Deaf Egyptians.

Resala 
Resala is an Islamic charitable organization in Egypt with centers throughout the country. Some of its centers offer educational services to Deaf individuals.

The Deaf Unit Cairo 
The Deaf Unit Cairo is a deaf organization/school based out of Cairo, Egypt that offers programs for deaf, hard of hearing, and hearing individuals. In 1982, The Deaf Unit of Cairo originally started out as a school for deaf children under the Episcopal Diocese Of Egypt with North Africa and the Horn of Africa before it expanded to include teacher training programs, the Deaf Club, the Deaf Church, two community based rehabilitation programs, and the start up of the Audiology Clinic. They target the deaf and heard of hearing population that cannot afford services and provide them with the opportunities they need socially and financially. One of their main goals is to help bridge the interaction between deaf and hearing individuals so they integrate themselves within hearing organizations to help foster this relationship. For example, in one of the programs, the Deaf Club, deaf adults attend events twice a week that help integrate them into the community and learn about Egyptian culture.

The Deaf Ministries International 
The Deaf Ministries International is a faith-based organization that works to give deaf individuals the right to education, employment, and to be able to practice their faith in their own language, ESL. The Deaf Ministries began in 1979 when Neuville and his wife moved to South Korea and created a small church specifically for the deaf. The message grew and so did the services as they now reach across 19 countries and provide churches, schools, small factories, farm projects, dormitories, and Christian centers to bring the message of Christ to the deaf. The organization focuses on three main areas which include church planting, education, and aid & development where deaf individuals can explore their community and culture through their faith.

Early hearing detection and intervention 

There is no Universal Newborn Hearing Screen (UNHS) program put in place in Egypt. There are a few initiatives and studies that have been conducted and put in place to begin screening newborns. In September 2019, the Ministry of Health and Population conducted a hearing survey "as a part of a presidential initiative for early detection and treatment of hearing loss and impairment for newborns nationwide". Approximately 3,500 health centers have taken part in this initiative screening newborns from day of birth up to 25 days after birth.

The initiative includes a step by step process to begin to determine the newborns who are struggling with hearing loss. After the first initial screening, 174,465 newborns were re-examined during a second screening at the same unit. After the second screening, 18,945 newborns were referred to approximately 30 different hospitals and medical centers all over the nation to seek further evaluation due to concerns found during their screenings. These referrals range anywhere from receiving hearing technologies such as cochlear implants or hearing aids to further medical treatment to diagnose due to lack of resources. Due to the lack of a UNHS system, many hospitals and medical centers have begun to implement their own methods, procedures, and tests to help detect hearing loss in newborns. Some of these tests and methods include Transient Evoked Otoacoustic Emissions (TEOAE) and Auditory Brainstem Response (ABR). TEOAE's test the cochlea's outer hair cells with a series of stimuli such as clicks whereas ABR's measure reactions to the nervous system with a series of stimuli.

Although Egypt has not yet implemented a UNHS system, they have created a screening method called Targeted Neonatal Hearing Screening (TNHS). TNHS's are considered to be a risk-based screening method where only neonates that pose possible risk factors for hearing loss are screened and testes after birth. The TNHS system is considered to be a "compromise" between the range of no UNHS system to a fully functioning UNHS system.

When it comes to early intervention measures, the research leans towards a more parental education effort, whereas for the child it doesn't begin until they enter school. The Deaf Unit in Cairo holds ESL classes for parents, family members, and friends in order to immerse them in learning ESL. They also offer workshops to teach parents how to respect their deaf child and break down the cultural misconceptions about the deaf not being as capable as a hearing individual. As part of a campaign initiated in 2019, hearing technologies such as cochlear implants would be offered to children who needed them. There are still barriers to overcome that lead infants to not receive hearing aids if they wanted due to financial costs not associated specifically with the cochlear implant device such as cost of the surgery, post surgical treatment, and follow up treatments and therapies.

Language deprivation 

Language deprivation is the universal term used to describe when a child lacks access to a "naturally occurring language during their critical language-learning years". When a child experiences language deprivation during their "critical period" they are at risk to experience delays cognitively and linguistically. In Egypt, studies have shown that Language Deprivation is an issue amongst DHH children. In 2015, a group of researchers set out to determine the risk factors associated with number of delayed language development cases in children who were referred to the phoniatric and Neuropediatric Unit as Sohag University (PNUSU). The study was split into two sections; one evaluating the socio-demographic  culture of the child and their family and the other language assessments using standardized language scales and measures. The participants included 800 Arabic speaking Egyptian children with delayed language development whose ages ranged from 18 months to 5 years and the results amongst the hearing impaired were concerning. According to the study, "among the 172 cases of hearing impairment, 67 cases (39.0%) were presented between 3-5 years, 46 cases (26.2%) after 5 years, 39 cases (22.7%) between 2-3 years, and 21 cases (12.2%) before two years". Out of all the studied cases, the percentage of hearing impairment children with language delay was amongst the top three.

Primary and secondary education 
The Deaf Unit in Cairo is a small deaf school in Cairo, Egypt that is home to currently 60 students. The Deaf Unit provides deaf students, who mostly come from hearing families, the opportunity to not only be immersed in deaf education, but foster "better communication between deaf and hearing people". The Deaf Unit is a boarding school like format where the children are given 3 meals a day and a place to live and sleep in order to create a deaf community. The school consists of "2 deaf teachers, 12 hearing teachers, 2 deaf house mothers, 2 hearing deaf mothers, five full time administration staff, and five women who support through kitchen and cleaning work". The students are taught a primary and middle school level education and after completing the curriculum, they will take their government issued exams at a government school in order to receive a government certificate. The children do then leave The Deaf Unit during the day in order to receive a secondary education at a local government school, but return to The Deaf Unit after school in order to help with the younger children, to take extra classes, or get help with their studies. The goal of The Deaf Unit is to prepare deaf students to be able to interact and live outside of the deaf community and provide them with the confidence skills to be able to live a successful independent life.

Employment 
The employment status and opportunities for Deaf individuals in Egypt is defined by a few government documents. Article 81 of Egypt's 2014 Constitution states that people with disabilities shall be given equal opportunities in all avenues of life such as through jobs, economically, socially, health, environment adaptations, political rights, justice, etc. Article 10 of the Rehabilitation Act No. 39, which was then amended by Law No. 49 in 1981, states that "five percent of the total number of employees in each unit of the state administration body, public bodies, and public sector shall be allocated for disabled recipients of rehabilitation certificates". The original quota stated in this act was 2% before it was amended in 1981 and increased to 5% of the employees in a workplace must be disabled. In 2006 the Egyptian census estimated that approximately 1.8% of the Egyptian population are disabled, deaf being amongst them.

Fulbright Egypt recently started accepting deaf individuals into their Community College Initiative (CCI) Program. The CCI sends approximately 1,000 men and women from Egypt to the United States to community college for vocational training, specifically geared toward learning skills to help improve their likelihood of employment. The deaf individuals accepted into the program are required to take an English Language course and learn ASL before traveling to the United States. The program includes comprehensive courses covering all areas the applicants wanted to study which included photoshop, HVAC, laser marking, embroidery, computer maintenance, etc. When the deaf individuals returned to Egypt they received additional training on how to communicate with other (deaf and hearing) which was implemented to improve teamwork and interview skills. The deaf individuals who participated in this program expressed that they were able to take what they learned through their training and apply them to their new professions.

Healthcare 
In Article 81 of Egypt's Constitution, it is deemed that that people with disabilities shall be given equal opportunities in all avenues of life such as through jobs, economically, socially, health, environment adaptations, political rights, justice, etc. According to the article Disability in North Africa, "the health and rehabilitation services for children and adults with disabilities are lacking, of poor quality, and do not meet all their needs". Although Egypt has ratified the UNCRPD, laws prohibiting discriminations in various areas of life do not exist or have not been implemented".

For deaf individuals assistive devices, such as cochlear implants and hearing aids, are rehabilitation services that have some issues. The coordination between the technical standards and the healthcare professional is weak and has led to "insufficient use" of these devices. In terms of health insurance, it is deemed to be highly segmented where many vulnerable populations are left out and "it can be assumed that large groups of persons with disabilities are not included in the health insurance system." A September 2022 study found that "inequalities hinder access to and utilization of hearing related resources in among Pediatric Cochlear Implantation (PCI)". There is currently little research and data specific evidence about the disability disparities in the healthcare system.

References 

Wikipedia Student Program
Egypt
Disability in Egypt